The Jiaozhou−Xinyi railway is a north–south railway that connects the cities of Jiaozhou in Shandong Province and Xinyi in Jiangsu Province, China. Major towns and cities along route include Jiaozhou, Gaomi, Zhucheng, Wulian, Ju County, Tancheng and Linyi in Shandong and Xinyi in Jiangsu.

Operation began on 16 December 2015.

References

See also

List of railways in China
Rail transport in the People's Republic of China

Railway lines in China
Rail transport in Shandong